Nibunan is a 2017 Indian action thriller film co-written, co-produced and directed by Arun Vaidyanathan. The film features an ensemble cast of Arjun, Prasanna, Varalaxmi Sarathkumar, Sruthi Hariharan, and Vaibhav. It was Arjun's 150th film. Featuring music composed by Navin and cinematography by Arvind Krishna, the film began production in late 2015. the film was simultaneously filmed and released in Kannada as Vismaya. The two versions of the film had a worldwide theatrical release on 28 July 2017 and received mixed reviews from critics as well as the audience. The film was also dubbed in Telugu under the title Kurukshetram and was released in September 2018.

Plot
Ranjith Kalidoss is a DSP in CB-CID, who along with Inspectors Joseph and Vandana, takes on high-profile cases and closes them successfully. Counter to his high intensity job, Ranjith has a peaceful family life with his wife, Shilpa, daughter Oviya, younger brother Sandeep, and their family dog Rocky. Ranjith's superiors assigns his team a task to pursue a group of 5 criminals, who continue to avoid justice with their political and economic influence. Ranjith suggests a more direct approach to taking them out, but his superior declines to go along with it. Before they could pursue the current assignment, they get dragged into another mystery. A parcel arrives at the police station one day that contains a small horse doll hanging on a noose. The figure has 4 holes, but otherwise no other clues. 

Not thinking much of it, the team decides to ignore it. A few days later, Shivanand, a local communist leader, goes missing and is later found in the warehouse hanging from the ceiling, tortured and his face covered in an animal mask, very much like the doll they received. Meanwhile, Ranjith is diagnosed with Parkinson's disease that compromises his job, and his happiness with his family is strained. The killer continues to taunt the team by sending clues as he kills more people, which includes Vishnu, a lawyer and Dr. Ramya, a pathologist. Ranjith follows one of the clues and finds the killer, but before he could take him down, the tremors that he has been experiencing lately slow him down. The killer knocks out Ranjith and escapes. 

When his team arrives, they inform him about a dead body in one of the buildings, but he already knows and describes what he would find without seeing it, also deduces that he  himself is the killer's next target. Back at the office, Ranjith manages to piece things together and connects the serial killings to a case that he investigated a few years earlier. Emmanuel and his wife are a rich architect couple in town, who lived with their 16-year-old daughter Catherine and a caretaker Mariadas. The couple were very successful business people, but had very little time for their daughter. Mariadas took care of Catherine. One day, the couple came home to find Catherine murdered and Mariadas missing. The house had been ransacked. The police closes the case concluding that it was a burglary gone bad, and Mariadas is on the run.

Shivanand pushes to reopen the case, which lands with Ranjith. He quickly focuses the attention on Emmanuel, where he sees a new golf club in his bag, and his investigation leads to the missing golf club with the caretaker's blood on it. He interrogates Emmanuel and his wife with the evidence, and they confess the truth. They came home one day to find Mariadas having sex with Catherine. Catherine only reached puberty a few days earlier, and their parents were busy preparing for the puberty ceremony. Enraged, Emmanuel hits Mariadas with the club and kills him. When Catherine threatens to call the police, her mother tries to stop her. In the scuffle, she accidentally falls on a sharp object and dies. Not able to wiggle their way out (as Ranjith and Vishnu refuse to take bribes and hush up the truth) and driven by guilt, Emmanuel and his wife hang themselves. Dr. Ramya is involved in the autopsy of Catherine, and the prosecutor is set to argue the case at the court and is present with Ranjith during the interrogation and confession. 

While all this is happening, Ranjith finds a doll hanging outside his house. When coming back, his dog Rocky was shot in the head. The killer is someone seeking vengeance for the deaths of the couple and is probably connected to the family. His boss takes over the case and tells Ranjith to get medical help for his condition. Joseph and Vandana continues the investigation, looking for a connection between Ranjith's case and the murders. There were no other family members that could be the murderer. Emmanuel has a nephew named Christopher, but he lives in the US. They are looking for someone with pharmaceutical knowledge, as the killer manufactured his own brand of anesthesia to knock out his victims.

Ranjith gets admitted to the hospital, where he continues to crack the clues, he concludes that it must be Christopher, as he has the motive, means and the know how. After checking with immigration services, they learn that Christopher did arrive in India not too long ago. A cop is dispatched to Christopher's house to investigate, and he finds all the evidence supporting their theory, but before he could alert his team, he is killed. Christopher baits Ranjith's team and captures Joseph and Vandana. Having no choice, Ranjith leaves the hospital to meet Christopher at a warehouse. There, he finds Joseph and Vandana standing on the floor with nooses around their necks. After a long struggle, Ranjith manages to overpower Christopher and hangs him. The press arrives at the site, and Ranjith tells them that Christopher is another victim of the serial killer.

A few days later, Joseph and Vandana meet Ranjith at his house and ask him why he did not inform the press that Christopher was the serial killer. Ranjith then reveals his plan about their earlier assignment. He plans to kill the five criminals and blame it on the serial killer, and also frame the last of them as the serial killer himself. Later, it is shown that his plan worked.

Cast

Arjun as DSP Ranjith Kalidass, CB-CID
Prasanna as Inspector Joseph, CB-CID
Varalaxmi Sarathkumar as Inspector Vandhana, CB-CID
Sruthi Hariharan as Shilpa, Ranjith's wife
Vaibhav as Sandeep, Ranjith's brother
Krishna as Christopher (Tamil)
 Karthik Jayaram  as Christopher (Kannada)
Suman as Emmanuel
Suhasini as Mrs. Emmanuel
Chandana Raj as Catherine Emmanuel
Uma Riyaz Khan as Dr. Ramya
Sudha Rani as Dr. Prema
Poster Nandakumar as Shivanand
Chetan as Mariadas
Baby Swaksha as Oviya
Vijay Anand as Inspector
David Solomon Raja as Inspector

Production
In July 2015, director Arun Vaidyanathan announced that he began working on a new action thriller film featuring Arjun in the lead role, which would be his 150th film as an actor. He revealed that the film would be based around the adventures of a police officer, and it would be made simultaneously in Tamil and Kannada, with filming taking place in Chennai and Bangalore. Vaidyanathan stated the script had been on his mind for several years, but he only began scripting it from December 2014. Umesh, Sudhan and Jayaram of Passion Film Factory, who had earlier made Kappal (2014), agreed to produce the film, while Aravind Krishna and Sathish Suriya were signed as cinematographer and editor, respectively. Actors Prasanna, Vaibhav and Bobby Simha were signed on to play further leading roles during August 2015, though Simha later opted out. Likewise, Varalaxmi Sarathkumar was selected to appear as a police officer, and Sruthi Hariharan was signed on to play the wife of Arjun's character. Following six months of pre-production, the film began canning scenes in November 2015 in Bangalore. In May 2017, the team chose to release the film's teaser by requesting 150 celebrities in the Indian film industry to release it via their Twitter page. The film's base plot is based on the 2008 Noida double murder case.

Soundtrack

The film's music was composed by Navin, and the album was released on 30 June 2017 by Zee Music South, featuring four songs.

Release
The Tamil and Kannada versions of the film were released across India on 28 July 2017, where the satellite rights for the Tamil, Kannada and Telugu version were sold to Polimer TV, Colors Kannada and Zee Telugu.

Critical reception
The film received primarily mixed reviews from critics. For Nibunan, a critic from The Times of India wrote, "watch it for the suspense-filled plot which has decent family moments, the surprise killer and the way the team uncovers the mystery through mind games", while rating the film with three and a half stars. India Today called the film a "convincing whodunnit", while The Hindu's reviewer called it a "killer premise". Meanwhile, for Vismaya, a reviewer from the Deccan Herald concluded that the film was "an edgy crime thriller" with a "nifty narrative", while the Times of India wrote it is "an interesting watch for those who like their films to have them at the edge of their seats". Likewise, The New Indian Express's critic wrote it was a "smart thriller" that "manages to extract thrills and nuggets of applause from a display of the vagaries of human psyche". In contrast, The Hindustan Times wrote the film gets "predictable and tedious beyond a point". Baradwaj Rangan of Film Companion wrote "The director, Arun Vaidyanathan, nails a vibe that lies midway between the fantasy universe of our masala films and the grungy netherworlds of Hollywood’s serial-killer thrillers..."

References

External links

2017 films
2017 action thriller films
2010s Tamil-language films
2010s Kannada-language films
Films set in Bangalore
Films shot in Bangalore
Indian multilingual films
Indian action thriller films
2017 multilingual films
Indian crime thriller films
2017 crime thriller films
Films directed by Arun Vaidyanathan